Harry "Apple Cheeks" Lumley (November 11, 1926 – September 13, 1998) was a Canadian professional ice hockey goaltender in the National Hockey League (NHL). He played for the Detroit Red Wings, New York Rangers, Chicago Black Hawks, Toronto Maple Leafs, and Boston Bruins between 1943 and 1960. He won the Vezina Trophy for being the goaltender to allow the fewest goals against in 1954, and won the Stanley Cup with the Red Wings in 1950. In 1980 Lumley was elected to the Hockey Hall of Fame.

Early life
Born in Owen Sound, Ontario, Lumley—known as "Apple Cheeks"—grew up playing local minor sports, but took quickly to hockey and wound up being a top-notch goaltender. Lumley starred for several years with the Owen Sound Mercurys and later with the Owen Sound Orphans (who were called that because they could not find a sponsor) and then the Barrie Colts. He also played with the Indianapolis Capitals of the American Hockey League, a minor league team of the Detroit Red Wings.

NHL career
Lumley made his professional debut in the National Hockey League, however, with the New York Rangers in the 1943–44 season, when he was loaned to the Rangers for a single game and appeared in 20 minutes of play. He was (and remains) the youngest goaltender to play in the NHL, as he was 17 years old.

In the 1950 playoffs, Lumley led the Red Wings to a Stanley Cup championship, recording three shutouts and a 1.85 GAA in fourteen games. After his performance, however, Jack Adams traded Lumley to the Chicago Black Hawks; Terry Sawchuk became the new goaltender for the Red Wings.

After playing with the Black Hawks for two seasons, he was again traded to the Toronto Maple Leafs. In 1953–54 season, Lumley won the Vezina Trophy, presented annually to the NHL's best goalie, with a GAA of 1.86. His 13 shutouts that year was a modern National Hockey League record that stood until Chicago's Tony Esposito recorded 15 in 1969–70. Lumley was also named First All-Star Team Goaltender in the 7th National Hockey League All-Star Game.

In 1956, Lumley was traded back to Chicago. He refused to play in Chicago and played the next year in the American Hockey League. He played with the Buffalo Bisons and the Providence Reds. Lumley would return to the National Hockey League in 1957 with the Boston Bruins. He played irregularly with them from 1957 to 1960 as he rotated his duties with Don Simmons. He would play one final season with the Winnipeg Warriors in the Western Hockey League.

He retired after the 1959–60 NHL season with 330 wins, 329 losses, 142 ties, and a 2.76 GAA. He was the first goaltender to have won 300 games and lost 300 games.  He was elected to the Hockey Hall of Fame in 1980. After retiring, Lumley was a longtime co-owner of the successful Orangeville Raceway. He died on September 13, 1998, of a heart attack.

Lumley originated the tactic of making a pocket at shin level in goalie pads so pucks would drop straight on the ice instead of deflecting off them to an opponent.

Legacy
The community centre in his hometown of Owen Sound, where he continued to live after retiring, was renamed in his honour prior to his death. It is now officially known as the Harry Lumley Bayshore Community Centre. There is a trophy named after him that is awarded to the goalie with the best goals against in the Ontario Sr.A lacrosse league.

Awards and achievements 
Stanley Cup Championship (1950)
Played in 1951, 1954, 1955 NHL All-Star Game
NHL First All-Star Team Goalie (1954 & 1955)
Vezina Trophy Winner (1954)
Hockey Hall of Fame 1980

Career statistics

Regular season and playoffs

See also
List of NHL goaltenders with 300 wins

External links

Picture of Harry Lumley's Name on the 1950 Stanley Cup Plaque
Harry Lumley Bayshore Community Centre

1926 births
1998 deaths
Barrie Colts (OHA junior A) players
Boston Bruins players
Canadian ice hockey goaltenders
Chicago Blackhawks players
Detroit Red Wings players
Hockey Hall of Fame inductees
Sportspeople from Owen Sound
New York Rangers players
Stanley Cup champions
Toronto Maple Leafs players
Vezina Trophy winners
Winnipeg Warriors (minor pro) players
Ice hockey people from Ontario